West Central Wireless is a local mobile phone provider serving Central and West Texas based in San Angelo, Texas, in the United States, with satellite offices in Brady, Texas. Their cellular services consist of 850 MHz HSPA+ and GSM networks and an overlayed 700 MHz (lower A and B blocks, 10x10 MHz) LTE network. The HSPA+ network began rollout in early 2012, with a deployment schedule stretching into late summer. CDMA services (1xRTT only) once existed due to the acquisition of Five Star Wireless offering wholesale roaming service providers, though services have been discontinued in 2019.

In some areas, West Central Wireless also AWS-1 (Band 4) spectrum for LTE. They also own 7.5x7.5 MHz of PCS (1900 MHz) spectrum in their original service area, as well as some 2.5 GHz (BRS/EBS) licenses, though it's unclear how much of that spectrum is deployed and on what technology (PCS could be HSPA+ or LTE, BRS/EBS would be LTE). Finally, they own 10x10 MHz of 600 MHz (Band 71) spectrum in most of their service area (excluding the SE corner originally served by Five Star Wireless), which can be used for LTE or 5G.

T-Mobile has a roaming agreement with West Central Wireless, allowing T-Mobile postpaid customers to use West Central's networks (GSM, HSPA, LTE) for voice, SMS, and data, with some prepaid brands (e.g. Boost Mobile) also able to access at least voice and SMS.

West Central's network currently provides native service in the following twenty-six counties of West Texas: Tom Green, Howard, Glasscock, Reagan, Crockett, Sterling, Irion, Schleicher, Sutton, Coke, Edwards, Runnels, Concho, Menard, Kimble, Kerr, Coleman, McCulloch, Mason, Gillespie, Kendall, Brown, San Saba, Mills, Comanche, Erath through tower microwave backhaul. As its parent company serves as a last mile provider in parts of the region, an extensive project to provide fiber backhaul has been completed in order to provide further expanded and competitive LTE features. 

The company offers prepaid service on their GSM network through the Right Wireless brand.

The company provides fixed wireless services using LTE technology on the 700 MHz band marked as the brand West Central Net. 

Through roaming agreements with other companies including AT&T Mobility and T-Mobile USA, and Verizon West Central is able to provide their customers with service when outside their home coverage area, albeit with significantly reduced minute and data allotments compared to what the company makes available within their own service area.

The companies operating under the West Central Wireless umbrella have a somewhat convoluted legal structure (d/b/a meaning "doing business as"):

 CGKC&H #2 Rural Partnership d/b/a West Central Wireless and d/b/a Right Wireless
 CT Cube, L.P. d/b/a West Central Wireless and d/b/a Right Wireless
 Mid-Tex Cellular, Ltd.
 Texas RSA 15B2, L.P. d/b/a Five Star Wireless and d/b/a Right Wireless

References 

Mobile phone companies of the United States